WX may refer to:

 CityJet (IATA code WX, for the Irish airline)
 wx-encoding, for Indian languages
 wxWidgets, a widget toolkit for creating graphical user interfaces (GUIs) for cross-platform applications
 Weather, in some contexts, including Morse code shorthand
 WX01 - WX10, NOAA Weather Radio channels
 County Wexford, Ireland
 Windows 10, as in the internal name for the update program, GWX
 WeChat colloquially referred to as wx, a Chinese multi-purpose messaging, social media, and mobile payment app developed by Tencent

See also

 XW (disambiguation)
 W (disambiguation)
 X (disambiguation)